Frankie and Johnny is a 1928 debut play written by Jack Kirkland. The play was turned into a 1936 film of the same name.

Synopsis
The story of a woman, Frankie, and a man, Johnny, and the romance that develops between them.

References

1928 plays
American plays
1920s debut plays